Gummawala is a small village in Roorkee Taluka that located in Haridwar district, Uttarakhand, India. The village has a  "Lord Shiva Temple".

External links 

 Gummawala On Google Maps.

 Gummawala's official website on the Wayback Machine.

References

Villages in Haridwar district